Reel FX Animation (or simply Reel FX) - formerly known as Reel FX Creative Studios is an American computer animation and visual effects studio based in Dallas, Texas; Hollywood, California. The studio develops and produces award-winning animated feature-length films, short films, and theme park content. Its first original animated feature film, Free Birds, was released in 2013 and grossed over $110 million worldwide. Its second film, The Book of Life was released in 2014 to widely positive reviews and received several nominations, including Best Animated Feature Nominations from the Golden Globe's, Critics’ Choice Awards, Producers Guild Awards and Annie Awards. Rumble, the third original film from Reel FX and a co-production with Paramount Animation, was released on December 15, 2021.

The studio has also recently teamed up with Netflix Animation to create Back to the Outback, Super Giant Robot Brothers! and with Warner Animation Group on Scoob!.

History
Reel FX was founded in 1993 as Reel Magic in Fort Worth, Texas. The company used an Onyx Reality Engine II system and was the sixth to purchase Autodesk Flame software. Following a large storm in Fort Worth, the company moved to Dallas in 1995, changing its name to Reel FX Creative Studios. Reel FX purchased West End Post in 1999 and moved another building in Dallas. The company produced a short film, The Man in the Moon, directed by William Joyce and Brandon Oldenburg.

After Reel FX provided visual effects for Spy Kids 2: The Island of Lost Dreams, and was noticed by 20th Century Fox Animation president Chris Meledandri, the company opened a second office in Pasadena, California, and moved its Dallas office to Deep Ellum. In 2007, Reel FX pitched their The Man in the Moon project to DreamWorks Animation, eventually expanding it into a movie based on William Joyce's book series The Guardians of Childhood. Reel FX also acquired Radium, which produced visual effects and commercials. Radium and Reel FX moved to a larger building in Santa Monica the following year.

In December 2010, it was announced that Reel FX produced an untitled 3D film with producer Andrew Adamson and Cirque du Soleil. In January 2012, it was announced by Paramount Pictures that it had acquired worldwide rights to the film, now titled Worlds Away directed by Adamson and executive-produced by James Cameron. In October 2012, The Hollywood Reporter revealed Reel FX's connection to the 2012 feature film, Rise of the Guardians, based on The Man in the Moon and The Guardians of Childhood.

Filmography

Original productions (under Reel FX Animation Studios)

Released films

In development

Short films

Television series

As an animation service

Feature films

Direct-to-video
 Barney Home Video (1996–2000) (special effects)
 G.I. Joe: Spy Troops (2003)
 G.I. Joe: Valor vs. Venom (2004)
 Action Man: X Missions – The Movie (2005)
 Boz: Colors and Shapes (2006)
 Boz: Adventures in Imagination (2006)
 The Very First Noel (2006)
 Thank You God for B-O-Zs and 1-2-3s! (2007)
 Start Singing with Boz (2008)
 Tales of the Black Freighter (2009)

Television

Series
 No Activity (season 4; animation assistance with ATK PLN for Flight School Studio)

Specials
 Jonah Sing-Along Songs and More! (2002; with Big Idea Productions)
 Halloweentown High (2004)
 Ice Age: A Mammoth Christmas (2011; with 20th Century Fox Animation and Blue Sky Studios)

Short films
 The Man in the Moon (1999)
 Aunt Fanny's Tour of Booty (2005; co-animated with Blue Sky Studios)
 Secrets of the Furious Five (2008; with DreamWorks Animation and Film Roman)
 Live Music (2009) (co-produced with Mass Animation)
 Looney Tunes: (with Warner Bros. Pictures and Warner Bros. Animation)
 Wile E. Coyote and Road Runner shorts:
 Rabid Rider (2010)
 Fur of Flying (2010)
 Coyote Falls (2010)
 Flash in the Pain (2014)
 I Tawt I Taw a Puddy Tat (2011)
 Daffy's Rhapsody (2012)
 Pacific Rum: Jaeger Pilot (2014)
 Son of Jaguar (2016)
 Best Fiends:
 Best Fiends: Boot Camp (2017)
 Best Fiends: Visit Minutia (2017)
 Best Fiends: Fort of Hard Knocks (2018)
 Best Fiends: Baby Slug's Big Day Out (2018)
 Best Fiends: Howie's Gift (2019)
 Best Fiends: Temper's Adventure (2019)
 Best Fiends: The Immortal Cockroach (2019)
 Best Fiends: The Fight Before Christmas (2019)
 Best Fiends: King Slug Industries (2020)
La Calesita (2022)

Theme park attractions
 The Simpsons Ride (2008; co-animated with Blur Studio)
 Despicable Me: Minion Mayhem (2012)

Virtual worlds
 Webosaurs
 Baby Bottle Pop

Production logos
 Relativity Media (2013)
 Paramount Animation (2019; co-produced with ATK PLN)
 Warner Animation Group (2016, 2017, 2020; co-produced with DevaStudios)

References

External links

 

1996 establishments in Texas
Companies based in Dallas
Companies based in Santa Monica, California
American companies established in 1996
Mass media companies established in 1996
American animation studios
Visual effects companies